This is a list of schools in the London Borough of Havering, England.

State-funded schools

Primary schools
Primary schools (including infant and junior schools) in the borough include:
RC indicates Roman Catholic and CE indicates Church of England

Ardleigh Green Infant School
Ardleigh Green Junior School
Benhurst Primary School
Brady Primary School
Branfil Primary School
Broadford Primary School
Brookside Infant School
Clockhouse Primary School
Concordia Academy
Crowlands Primary School
Crownfield Infant School
Crownfield Junior School
Dame Tipping CE Primary School
Drapers' Brookside Infant School
Drapers' Brookside Junior School
Drapers' Maylands Primary School
Drapers' Pyrgo Priory School
Elm Park Primary School
Engayne Primary School
Gidea Park Primary School
Hacton Primary School
Harold Court Primary School
Harold Wood Primary School
Harrow Lodge Primary School
Hilldene Primary School
Hylands Primary School
The James Oglethorpe Primary School
La Salette RC Primary School
Langtons Infant School
Langtons Junior Academy
The Mawney Foundation School
Mead Primary School
Nelmes Primary School
Newtons Primary School
Oasis Academy Pinewood
Parklands Primary School
Parsonage Farm Primary School
Rainham Village Primary School
Rise Park Infant School
Rise Park Junior School
The RJ Mitchell Primary School
St Alban's RC Primary School
St Edward's CE Primary School
St Joseph's RC Primary School
St Mary's RC Primary School
St Patrick's RC Primary School
St Peter's RC Primary School
St Ursula's RC Primary School
Scargill Infant School
Scargill Junior School
Scotts Primary School
Squirrels Heath Infant School
Squirrels Heath Junior School
Suttons Primary School
Towers Infant School
Towers Junior School
Upminster Infant School
Upminster Junior School
Whybridge Infant School
Whybridge Junior School

Secondary schools
Secondary schools include:

Abbs Cross Academy and Arts College 
Bower Park Academy
The Brittons Academy
The Campion School  (Boys, RC)
Coopers' Company and Coborn School 
Drapers' Academy
Emerson Park Academy 
Frances Bardsley Academy for Girls (Girls)
Gaynes School  
Hall Mead School
Harris Academy Rainham 
Hornchurch High School
Marshalls Park Academy 
Redden Court School
Royal Liberty School (Boys)
Sacred Heart of Mary Girls' School (Girls, RC)
St Edward's Church of England Academy (CE)
Sanders School

Special and alternative schools
Special schools in the borough include:
Corbets Tey School
Lime Academy Forest Approach
Lime Academy Ravensbourne
Olive AP Academy - Havering

Further education
Havering Sixth Form College
Havering College of Further and Higher Education

Independent schools

Primary and preparatory schools
Gidea Park College
Oakfields Montessori School
St Mary's Hare Park School

Senior and all-through schools
Immanuel School

Special and alternative schools
BEP Academy
The Bridge
KORU Independent AP Academy

References 

 
Havering